The Official Opposition Shadow Cabinet in Canada was appointed after the 2021 Canadian federal election in September 2021.

A new shadow cabinet was formed after the 2022 Conservative Party of Canada leadership election. Pierre Poilievre appointed a Shadow Cabinet in October 2022.

List

September 2021 

 Candice Bergen, Luc Berthold (from February 2022) - Deputy Leader of the Official Opposition

October 2022

Critics 
 Melissa Lantsman and Tim Uppal - Deputy Leader of the Official Opposition
 Ben Lobb — Digital Government 
 John Barlow — Agriculture, Agri-Food and Food Security
 Rachael Thomas — Canadian Heritage
 Jamie Schmale — Crown-Indigenous Relations
 Jasraj Hallan — Finance and Middle Class Prosperity
 Tracy Gray — Employment, Future Workforce Development and Disability Inclusion
 Gérard Deltell — Environment and Climate Change
 Michelle Ferreri — Families, Children and Social Development
 Lianne Rood — Federal Economic Development Agency for Eastern, Central and Southern Ontario
 Clifford Small — Fisheries, Oceans and the Canadian Coast Guard
 Michael Chong — Foreign Affairs
 Stephen Ellis — Health
 Scott Aitchison — Housing and Diversity and Inclusion 
 Tom Kmiec — Immigration, Refugees and Citizenship
 Eric Melillo — Federal Economic Development Agency for Northern Ontario (Associate, Crown-Indigenous Relations)
 Rick Perkins —Innovation, Science and Industry
 Garnett Genuis — International Development
 Kyle Seeback — International Trade
 Brad Vis — Small Business Recovery and Growth
 Matt Jeneroux — Supply Chain Issues
 Scot Davidson — Red Tape Reduction
 Rob Moore — Justice and Attorney General of Canada
 Marilyn Gladu — Civil Liberties
 Todd Doherty — Mental Health and Suicide Prevention 
 Laila Goodridge — Addictions
 Bob Zimmer — Northern Affairs and Arctic Sovereignty; Canadian Northern Economic Development Agency
 Pat Kelly — Prairie Economic Development (Advisor to the Leader, Economy)
 Tako van Popta — Pacific Economic Development
 Richard Martel — Sport; Economic Development Agency of Canada for the Regions of Quebec 
 James Bezan — National Defence
 Adam Chambers — National Revenue
 Shannon Stubbs — Natural Resources
 Joel Godin — Official Languages
 Jake Stewart — Atlantic Canada Opportunities Agency
 Raquel Dancho — Public Safety
 Kelly Block — Public Services and Procurement
 Dane Lloyd — Emergency Preparedness
 Dan Mazier — Rural Economic Development & Connectivity
 Anna Roberts — Seniors
 Tony Baldinelli — Tourism
 Mark Strahl — Transport
 Stephanie Kusie — Treasury Board
 Blake Richards — Veterans Affairs
 Karen Vecchio — Women and Gender Equality and Youth
 Michael Barrett — Ethics and Accountable Government
 Leslyn Lewis — Infrastructure and Communities
 Chris Lewis — Labour
 Gary Vidal — Indigenous Services 
 Ryan Williams — Pan-Canadian Trade and Competition
 Blaine Calkins — Hunting, Fishing and Conservation
 Michael Cooper — Democratic Reform

References 

Canadian shadow cabinets
Leaders of the Opposition (Canada)